Riom (Auvergnat Riam) is a commune in the Puy-de-Dôme department in Auvergne in central France. It is a sub-prefecture of the department.

History

Until the French Revolution, Riom was the capital of the province of Auvergne, and the seat of the dukes of Auvergne. The city was of Gaulish origin, the Roman Ricomagus. In the intensely feudalized Auvergne of the 10th century, the town grew up around the collegiate Church of Saint Amabilis (Saint Amable), the local saint, who was the object of pilgrimages. Riom was the capital of the dukes of Auvergne. In the 14th century the city benefitted from the patronage of Jean, duc de Berry, who rebuilt the Ducal Palace and the Saint-Chapelle. In 1531, Riom and Auvergne reverted to the Crown of France.

In 1942, Riom was the site of the Vichy government's abortive war-guilt trials, called Riom Trials.

Population

Sights
In 1985 Riom received the French classification of Ville d'Art et d'Histoire recognizing its sixteen classified historical monuments as well as another 57 on the supplementary listings. Several 17th- and 18th-century private houses (hôtels particuliers) are open to the public with collections of costumes and works of decorative art.

Public library
The Bibliothèque Municipale de Riom, is a public library in Riom. Since 1968 it has been located on Avenue Mgr Martrou. The library was established after the French Revolution.

The library collection began after the French Revolution and it has been housed in a number of buildings including a college and at Riom city hall. In 1905 the library was moved to a Carmelite convent building and in 1941 it was housed in a museum. The present home of the collection was opened in 1968.

It contains approximately 90,000 items (books, journals, audio cassette tapes and video). The special part of the collection consists of 15 medieval manuscripts, which came from revolutionary confiscations made in religious communities. The Ministry of Culture and Communication digitized three illuminated manuscripts. Of the illuminated works five volumes are from the 15th - 16th centuries.

Notable people
Riom was the birthplace of:
 Pierre Victor, baron Malouet (1740–1814), publicist and politician
 Gilbert Romme (1750–1795), politician
 Joseph Projectus Machebeuf (1812–1889), Vicar Apostolic of Colorado and Utah; Bishop of Denver, USA
 Henri Hébrard de Villeneuve (1848–1925), Olympic fencer
 Eugene Gilbert (1889–1918), pioneer aviator, WW1 fighter pilot
 Alan Stivell (1944-), Celtic musician and singer, recording artist and master of the Celtic harp
 Rufus (1942-), actor
 Anne Marie Dias Borges (1976-), franco-Cape-Verdean journalist and radio and television host
 Sébastien Mazeyrat (1978-), footballer

International relations

Riom is twinned with:

 Adur, England, United Kingdom
 Algemesí, Spain
 Nördlingen, Germany
 Viana do Castelo, Portugal
 Żywiec, Poland

See also 
 Communes of the Puy-de-Dôme department

References

External links

 Riom - Official site for the city of Riom (in French).
 Riom Tourism - Official site from the Auvergne Office de Tourisme.
 Joan of Arc's letter to Riom - Translation by Allen Williamson of a letter dictated by Joan of Arc to the people of Riom on November 9, 1429.
 The Musée de Veygoux is a museum in the Manoir de Veygoux dedicated to the French Revolution and Desaix.
The Riom trials of 1942, from a Marxist perspective

Communes of Puy-de-Dôme
Subprefectures in France
Auvergne